Common Clay may refer to:

 Common Clay (play), a 1915 American play by Cleves Kinkead
 Common Clay (1919 film), a silent film adaptation
 Common Clay (1930 film), a sound film adaptation starring Constance Bennett

See also
 Private Number, a 1936 adaptation of the play